Vederkovo is a rural locality (a village) in Komyanskoye Rural Settlement, Gryazovetsky District, Vologda Oblast, Russia. The population was 13 as of 2002.

Geography 
Vederkovo is located 31 km northeast of Gryazovets (the district's administrative centre) by road. Sychevo is the nearest rural locality.

References 

Rural localities in Gryazovetsky District